Cymothoe lurida, the lurid glider, is a butterfly in the family Nymphalidae. It is found in Côte d'Ivoire, Ghana, Nigeria, Cameroon, Equatorial Guinea, Gabon, the Republic of the Congo, the Central African Republic, Angola, the Democratic Republic of the Congo, Uganda, Kenya, Tanzania and Zambia. The habitat consists of lowland to submontane forests, including riparian forests.

Males of the species mud-puddle. Both sexes are attracted to fermenting bananas.

The larvae feed on Dovyalis, Rawsonia and Rinorea species.

Subspecies
Cymothoe lurida lurida (Ivory Coast, Ghana)
Cymothoe lurida azumai Carcasson, 1964 (north-western Tanzania, Zambia)
Cymothoe lurida butleri Grünberg, 1908 (Uganda)
Cymothoe lurida centralis Overlaet, 1952 (Democratic Republic of the Congo: central to Lualaba, Kasai, Lomami and Sankuru)
Cymothoe lurida hesione Weymer, 1907 (Nigeria: Cross River loop, Cameroon, Gabon, Congo, Central African Republic, northern Angola, western Democratic Republic of the Congo)
Cymothoe lurida sublurida Fruhstorfer, 1903 (Bioko)
Cymothoe lurida tristis Overlaet, 1952 (Congo, Uganda: west to Bwamba and Toro, Democratic Republic of the Congo: Kinshasa, Mongala, Uele, Ituri and Kivu)

References

Butterflies described in 1871
Cymothoe (butterfly)
Butterflies of Africa
Taxa named by Arthur Gardiner Butler